Dapi Township is a rural township in Yunlin County, Taiwan.

Geography
It has a population total of 18,178 and an area of 44.9973 km2.

Administrative divisions
Dapi Township consists of 15 villages, which are Beihe, Beizeng, Dade, Fenggang, Fengtian, Jiaxing, Jitian, Lianmei, Nanhe, Sanjie, Shangyi, Songzhu, Xingan, Xizeng and Yiran.

Economy

Dapi is an agricultural town where the major crops are rice, bamboo shoots, leaf mustard and flowers. It also has livestock husbandry, such as pigs, lambs, chickens, ducks and deer, as well as aquatic animals such as soft-shell turtles and fishes. The township supplies 85% of pickled mustard demand in Taiwan.

References

Townships in Yunlin County